Eduardo Prieto (15 April 1912 – 8 July 2003) was a Mexican épée and foil fencer, and sailor. He competed at the 1932 Summer Olympics in four fencing events and at the 1964 Summer Olympics in sailing.

References

External links
 

1912 births
2003 deaths
Mexican male épée fencers
Mexican male sailors (sport)
Olympic fencers of Mexico
Olympic sailors of Mexico
Fencers at the 1932 Summer Olympics
Sailors at the 1964 Summer Olympics – Dragon
Sportspeople from Mexico City
Mexican male foil fencers
20th-century Mexican people